Fernando Alfredo Maldonado Hernández (born 8 January 1966) is a Mexican politician and lawyer affiliated with the PRI. He currently serves as Deputy of the LXII Legislature of the Mexican Congress representing the State of Mexico.

References

1966 births
Living people
Politicians from the State of Mexico
20th-century Mexican lawyers
Members of the Chamber of Deputies (Mexico)
Institutional Revolutionary Party politicians
21st-century Mexican politicians
Universidad Anáhuac México alumni
Deputies of the LXII Legislature of Mexico